Nor Shafeeqah Yahya is a Malaysian international lawn bowler.

Bowls career
Yahya won the bronze medal in the fours at the 2008 World Outdoor Bowls Championship in Christchurch.  

She has won three gold medals and one silver medal at the Asia Pacific Bowls Championships.

References

Malaysian female bowls players
Living people
Year of birth missing (living people)
21st-century Malaysian women